DRIEMS  is a group of technical and professional institution located in Tangi Cuttack district of Odisha, India, India. It has been affiliated to the Biju Patnaik University of Technology since 2004. From 1999 to 2003 it was affiliated to Utkal Universityfor its engineering & management programmes. It is accredited by the National Board of Accreditation and National Assessment and Accreditation council and rated as an "A" grade institute. It is an ISO 9001:2008 certified institution. It offers the following courses:
 B.Tech.
 M.Tech.
 3 year diploma in engineering
 MBA
 BBA & BCA
 School & College of Nursing
 +2 Science
 Industrial training institute
 Hotel management

Career Development Cell 
Career Development Cell is the most dynamic and performing cell, which is functioning to cater the need of students 360 degree skill enhancement and also to position them in different national and multinational companies. Institute-Industry interfacing is one of the most important activity of CDC. Making students employable, adding industry required skill sets and giving a professional finishing touch to every students is the main objective of CDC.

Junior College
The Junior college started in 2003 offering science education for grades 11 and 12. The intake is 192 students per year, as of 2015. This college is affiliated to Council of Higher Secondary Education, Odisha [CHSE(O)]. The college consists of physics, chemistry, information technology and biology laboratories.

Diploma School
The diploma school at DRIEMS provides a diploma in engineering in five streams. Started in 2003, the school has the capability of 500 students per annum. It is affiliated to the State Council for Technical Education and Vocational Training, Odisha (SCTE&VT, Odisha) The school provides the following streams:
 Computer Science
 Mechanical Engineering
 Electrical Engineering
 Electronics & Telecommunications
 Civil Engineering

B.Tech
The Degree College Of DRIEMS provides graduate degrees in seven streams of engineering. It is affiliated to the State University i.e. Biju Patnaik University of Technology, Odisha. The college provides the following streams:

Electronics & Telecommunications Engineering
The department has 120 seats, the maximum in the institute. It has a micro electronics laboratory, communications laboratory, software laboratory and basic electronics laboratory. The department has a student chapter of the Professional Society IETE (Institute of Electronics and Telecommunication Engineering) named IETE Student Forum (ISF Chapter) and a student society named DRIESEL (DRIEMS Society for Electronics). The societies are run by the students to improve their leadership and organizing abilities. They organize technical quiz, technical fest, seminars and workshop annually.

Applied Electronics & Instrumentation Engineering

Computer Science Engineering
The department is equipped with labs and class rooms. There are more than 700 computers with the LAN/WAN configuration, networked with five IBM servers, Fiber Optic Network Backbone for connectivity providing users access to the Internet and Intranet facilities, with online backup by UPS. The department runs B. Tech. and M.Tech programmes.

The department has made wireless internet connectivity available on the campus, thereby providing the students with internet access anywhere on the campus and hostel by using their laptops.

COMFLUENCE, the departmental journal is published to provide a forum for research-oriented articles.

Electrical Engineering
This stream deals with generation, transmission, distribution, utilisation and control of electrical power. The department encourages students to undergo industrial training at organisations for practical exposure.

"IMPULSE", a technical magazine is published to bring students up to date with changes in the field through articles and research papers. 
"TRANS-O-BIANS" a student profile magazine is published yearly to bring together student ideas and values.

Mechanical Engineering
The Department of Mechanical Engineering trains students in mechanical engineering science as well as the application of scientific methods for the scientific design of engineering systems.

The department's programme includes a study of a number of engineering sciences to which the students are introduced at the core curriculum level, experimental solution of physical problems, techniques and method of design of systems.

The broad areas include Energy Conversion and Power Systems, Heat Transfer and Fluid Mechanics, Mechanics of Solids and Stress Analysis, Manufacturing Science, Industrial Engineering, Automatic Controls and Engineering Design. There are course oriented laboratories where the students do experimental work leading to a better understanding of physical situations.

The scope of Mechanical Engineering is expanding with advancement in the areas of CAD, CAM, CIM, FMS and Robotics etc.

Civil Engineering
One of the primary engineering departments of the institute, the Department of Civil Engineering offers courses leading to B.Tech degree in Civil Engineering. The department has a Computer Center to cater to the needs of the students and staff. It undertakes industrial consultancy work as a part of its interaction with industry and also organizes seminars/symposia for professional interaction.

School & College of Nursing
DRIEMS School & College of Nursing was established in the year 2013
It has following Programs/Course
 B.Sc. Nursing
 Diploma in General Nursing and Midwifery (GNM)
 ANM (Auxiliary Nurse & Midwives)

References

External links
 DRIEMS website

Universities and colleges in Odisha
Colleges affiliated with Biju Patnaik University of Technology
Educational institutions established in 1999
1999 establishments in Orissa